Oregon State University Ecampus is the online education unit of Oregon State University. OSU Ecampus develops and delivers courses, degree programs and certificate programs online and at a distance to students worldwide. Ecampus courses and programs are delivered online or in a hybrid format that combines virtual learning with face-to-face instruction. 

In January 2023, the Oregon State Ecampus bachelor's degree programs were ranked top 10 in the nation by U.S. News & World Report for the eighth straight year.

Oregon State University is institutionally accredited by the Northwest Commission on Colleges and Universities (NWCCU).

History
Oregon State University was one of the first colleges to bring distance-education classes to residents living hundreds of miles from a school's main campus. As early as the 1880s, farmers in rural Oregon could attend college-level lectures on agricultural science in their own cities and towns. Early lectures were often given on board a train's caboose and could be scheduled through the local train station. Over the next several decades, the university delivered pioneering programs in business management and manufacturing to residents of early Portland, Oregon and the larger cities along the Oregon Coast. 

By 1980, OSU began offering a distance-learning degree in liberal studies to students living throughout Oregon. Coursework was delivered through video presentations and scheduled mail and phone correspondence with instructors. A few years later, the university offered its first coursework in liberal studies at Central Oregon Community College in Bend, Oregon. These classes eventually paved the way for the university to establish its first distance-degree program at COCC and later at community colleges throughout the state.

In 2002, OSU converted its Distance and Continuing Education program into the now-familiar OSU Ecampus. Today, OSU Ecampus is one of the top online universities in the nation and delivers more than 90 degrees and programs online. Ecampus is now under the leadership of Lisa L. Templeton, who assumed the role of executive director in November 2009. In 2017, she was appointed associate provost of Ecampus.

Academics
Oregon State Ecampus partners with more than 1,200 OSU faculty members annually to develop and deliver programs and courses online. 
All Ecampus classes are developed by the same Oregon State faculty who teach on campus. Oregon State offers more than 1,750 courses online. Working with Ecampus instructional designers to build an online course, OSU faculty use animations, readings, videos, conferences and other interactive materials for students online.

Ecampus delivers more than 100 undergraduate and graduate programs online, with some hybrid programs that feature face-to-face components. The programs cover an array of disciplines, including natural resources, liberal arts, education and science, technology, engineering, and mathematics (STEM).

Students

Ecampus serves students in all 50 states and more than 60 countries. OSU's distance learners include full- and part-time students, working and retired professionals, community college students, active-duty and retired military, high school students and lifelong learners.

In the 2021-22 academic year, 29,106 students enrolled in at least one Ecampus course. More than 12,800 of those students were enrolled exclusively in Ecampus online programs.

A record 1,680 distance students received their diplomas from OSU in June 2022.

Rankings
U.S. News & World Report recognized Oregon State Ecampus on many of its Best Online Programs lists in 2023.
 No. 8 in Best Online Bachelor’s Programs
 No. 1 in Best Online Bachelor’s in Psychology Programs
 No. 5 in Best Online Bachelor’s in Business Programs
 No. 11 in Best Online Bachelor’s Programs for Veterans
 No. 16 in Best Online Master's in Engineering Management Programs
 No. 19 in Best Online Master’s in Engineering Programs
 No. 25 in Best Online Master’s in Engineering Programs for Veterans

References

External links
 Official website
 Lisa Templeton Oral History Interview

Oregon State University
Education in Corvallis, Oregon
American educational websites
2002 establishments in Oregon